Amo tu cama rica is a 1992 Spanish romantic comedy film directed by Emilio Martínez-Lázaro, which stars Ariadna Gil and Pere Ponce. The film helped to launch the acting career of a young Ariadna Gil.

Plot 
The fiction tracks the up and downs on the relationship between Pedro and Sara.

Cast

Production 
Amo tu cama rica was co-written by the director Emilio Martínez-Lázaro alongside  and David Trueba. The score was composed by Michel Camilo. Ariadna Gil and Pere Ponce joined the cast as leads after a three-month-long casting of young actors across Spain.  took over cinematography duties. Produced by Fernando Trueba PC and Kaplan S.A, filming began by April 1991 in Madrid.

Release 
The film was theatrically released in Spain on 31 January 1992.

Awards and nominations 

|-
| align = "center" | 1992 || 39th Ondas Awards || Best Film Performers || Pere Ponce & Ariadna Gil ||  || align = "center" | 
|}

See also 
 List of Spanish films of 1992

References

External links 
 Amo tu cama rica at ICAA's Catálogo de Cinespañol

Films shot in Madrid
Spanish romantic comedy films
1990s Spanish-language films
1992 romantic comedy films